Bum or bums may refer to:

Slang
 Buttocks, two rounded portions of the anatomy on the posterior of the pelvic region of many bipeds or quadrupeds
 A lazy person
 A homeless person
Bum a cigarette or a "smoke", meaning to borrow

Places
 Bum, Afghanistan, several locales
 Bum, Azerbaijan, a village
 Bum Chiefdom, Bonthe District, Sierra Leone

People

Nickname
Bum Bright (1920–2004), American businessman
Lee McClung (1870–1914), football player and 22nd Treasurer of the United States
Bum Phillips (1923–2013), American football coach

Given name
 Kim Bum (born 1989), South Korean actor
 Woo Bum-kon, South Korean spree killer and mass murderer

Surname
 Khem Bahadur Bum, Nepalese politician elected in 2008
 Narendra Bahadur Bum, Nepalese politician elected in 1999

Other
 Bachelor of Unani Medicine and Surgery, see Unani medicine#Education and recognition
 Bums, nickname for Brooklyn Dodgers baseball team
 B.U.M. Equipment, US clothing brand
 Bum language, spoken in Cameroon
 ISO 639 code for the Bulu language, in Cameroon
 Breguet Bre.4 or BUM, French World War I bomber

See also
 Bum Bum Island, Malaysia
 "Bum Bum", a 2001 song by Italian singer Gigi D'Alessio
 "Bum Bum", a 2015 song by Kat DeLuna and Trey Songz.
 
 
 Bumb (disambiguation)